Lorenzo Crasso (Naples, 1623-1691) was an Italian author and poet of the Baroque period.

Biography 
Lorenzo Crasso, Barone di Pianura, was a Neapolitan, a doctor of laws, and an active lawyer. He was a man of wealth, and possessed a notable library in his palace in Vicolo S. Paolo, in which many of Giambattista Marino's manuscripts were kept, which were later dispersed. Other than these meagre details, and his books, nothing appears to be known of him. He had many friends among the literary men of his time, and one frequently meets with poems addressed to him in their books – Giuseppe Battista belonged to this circle. Crasso published Epistole Heroiche, Venice, 1655 (imitations of Ovid); Elogi di Huomini Letterati, Venice, 1656 (each notice being preceded by a portrait); Istoria de’ Poeti Greci e di que’ che ’n Greca Lingua han poetato, Naples, 1678; and Elogi di Capitani Illustri, Venice, 1683. As only the first part of the last book was published, it has been conjectured that Crasso died at this time or just before. Crasso was a member of the Neapolitan Oziosi and the Bolognese Gelati. His nickname among the Gelati was “Il Costante,” and his impresa was ivy climbing a dead tree trunk with the motto frigore viridior (“from frozen I become green again”).

Crasso’s Istoria de’ Poeti Greci professes to supersede the similar works of Franciscus Patricius and Gerardus Vossius; and, while far from exhaustive, it is in many ways a creditable performance, and contains some information even today not easily found elsewhere. This applies, of course, particularly to the writers of Greek verse nearly contemporary with the author ; for he includes not only the Greeks of the Renaissance, and such others as write in Greek as Alessandra Scala, Adrianus Turnebus, and Jean Daurat, but comes down to Urban VIII and Leo Allatius. His notices of the ancient poets, on the other hand, if generally well documented, are usually too perfunctory.

Crasso's work was much appreciated by the Italian scholars, but severely criticized by the French ones.

Works

References

Bibliography 

 
 
 
 
 

1623 births
1691 deaths
Writers from Naples
Italian poets
Italian scholars
Italian male poets
Baroque writers